Yanhuang Chunqiu, sometimes translated as China Through the Ages, was a monthly journal in the People's Republic of China commonly identified as liberal and reformist. It was started in 1991, with the support of Xiao Ke, a liberal general of the Chinese People's Liberation Army. Du Daozheng served as the founding director of the publisher.

The traditional version of the journal was regarded as one of the most influential liberal journals in China, issuing some 200,000 copies per month. It ceased its operations in 2016, however, due to the crackdown from Xi Jinping's administration–even though Xi Zhongxun, the father of Xi Jinping, had publicly supported the publisher. A new management team with pro-Xi editors continue to make publications.

History

Founding 
In 1990, Xiao Ke, a liberal General of the Chinese People's Liberation Army and standing member of the Central Advisory Commission, began to organize the launch of a history journal together with other officials. In March 1991, the credentials for publication were approved, and in April all personnel of the publisher started to work in Beijing.

On July 1, 1991, the Yanhuang Chunqiu journal made its first issue. Du Daozheng served as the founding director of the publisher. In early 1992, after Deng Xiaoping's southern tour, Yanhuang Chunqiu began to publish articles in support of the Reforms and Opening-up program. In 2001, Xi Zhongxun, a leading reformist and father of Xi Jinping, publicly supported and praised the journal.

Political interference
In July 2010, Yanhuang Chunqiu published a memoir by retired Politburo member Yang Rudai praising Zhao Ziyang. It marked a rare break of the long-standing taboo in China against mentioning the former leader since he was ousted after the Tiananmen Square protests of 1989.

In January 2013, Yanhuang Chunqiu website was temporarily shutdown by the Chinese government after it published an editorial urging the implementation of constitutional rights.

In July 2015, founding publisher Du Daozheng, had taken up the role of editor-in-chief, when Yang Jisheng was forced to resign. In connection with his resignation, Yang published two letters: the first explained the reasons for his resignation to the members of Yanhuang Chunqiu and its readers; the second was sent to the General Administration of Press and Publication and criticized intensified government restrictions on topics the journal was permitted to cover.

In 2016, China's media regulator, the State Administration of Press, Publication, Radio, Film and Television declared 37 recent news items in breach of political guidelines.

Closure of publication
Long considered influential among liberals and reformists, in July 2016, the entire editorial team resigned following the sacking of long-time publisher Du Daozheng and demotion of chief editor Xu Qingquan, by order of the Chinese National Academy of Arts, amid intensifying pressure from the authorities to soften its editorial stance. The magazine had been founded in 1991 by reform-minded party veterans, including the efforts of General Xiao Ke, and had a circulation of around 200,000.

The July 2016 restrictions led the magazine’s editorial staff to announce that the magazine could no longer be published, as the academy had unilaterally abandoned an agreement allowing its publication within defined bounds. They further revealed that academy staff had seized control of the Yanhuang Chunqiu website at the magazine's offices. Nevertheless it appeared that publication would continue, under staff from the academy including Jia Leilei, its former vice-president.

After he was dismissed, Du announced that the publication had been suspended, and said the closure resembled methods used in the Cultural Revolution.

References

External links
 Official website

1991 establishments in China
2016 disestablishments in China
Chinese-language magazines
Monthly magazines published in China
Political magazines published in China
Defunct magazines published in China
Defunct political magazines
Magazines established in 1991
Magazines disestablished in 2016
Liberalism in China